Touch is the seventh album by the Vallejo, California musical group Con Funk Shun.  It was released in late 1980 on the Mercury Records label.

Track listing
"Too Tight" (M. Cooper)  6:17 	
"Lady's Wild" (F. Pilate, G. Jackson, M. Cooper)  4:53 	
"Give Your Love To Me" (C. Martin)  4:58 	
"Pride And Glory" (F. Pilate, K. Fuller)  4:29 	
"Kidnapped!" (D. Thomas, M. Poole)  3:24 	
"Welcome Back To Love" (L. L. McCall, L. McCall, P. M. Allen)  3:55 	
"Touch" (F. Pilate, G. Jackson)  4:31 	
"Can't Say Goodbye" (F. Pilate)  4:19 	
"Play Widit" (F. Pilate, P. Harrell, P. W. Harrell) 4:18

Personnel
Michael Vernon Cooper - Lead Guitar, Rhythm Guitar, Lead and Background Vocals
Louis A. McCall - Drums, Percussion, Vocals
Felton C. Pilate - Slide & Valve Trombone, Keyboards, Synthesizer, Rhythm Guitar, Vocals
Karl Fuller - Trumpet, Flugelhorn, Percussion, Vocals
Paul Harrell - Soprano Saxophone, Tenor Saxophone, Alto Saxophone, Flute, Vocals
Cedric Martin - Bass Guitar, Vocals
Danny A. Thomas - Keyboards, Vocals
Garry Jackson - Bass
Carl Lockett - Lead Guitar
Martin K. Riley - Trombone
Marvin McFadden - Trumpet
Sheila E, Pete Escovedo, Scott Roberts - Percussion
Debra L. Henry - Background Vocals

Charts

Singles

References

External links
 Con Funk Shun-Touch at Discogs

1980 albums
Con Funk Shun albums
Mercury Records albums